Winifreda is a town in the province of La Pampa, Argentina, located 50 kilometres from Santa Rosa, in the department of Conhelo.

The town was founded on April 3, 1915 (tough some version set it on March 11, 1916), at the location of the railway station that was previously known as "Punta de Rieles" and "El Quemado".

It currently holds 2,124 inhabitants, plus 844 in the rural surrounding area.

External links

La Pampa towns - Winifreda (Spanish)
Winifreda Portal (Spanish)

Populated places in La Pampa Province